David Cargill may refer to:

 David Cargill (footballer) (1936–2011), Scottish footballer
 David Cargill (alpine skier) (born 1957), British former alpine skier
 David Cargill (missionary), British missionary to Fiji (1830s)
 David Sime Cargill (1826–1904), Scottish businessman